Pseudohemihyalea carteronae is a moth in the family Erebidae. It was described by Hervé de Toulgoët in 1982. It is found in Costa Rica.

References

Moths described in 1982
carteronae